What's New Pussycat? may refer to:

 What's New Pussycat?, a 1965 comedy film directed by Clive Donner
 What's New Pussycat? (song), a song by Welsh singer Tom Jones
 What's New Pussycat? (Tom Jones album) , a 1965 album by Tom Jones
 What's New Pussycat? (musical), a 2021 jukebox musical featuring the songs of Tom Jones, based on Henry Fielding's 1749 novel The History of Tom Jones, a Foundling
 What's New, Pussycat? (album) a 1997 album by Yukari Tamura

Disambiguation pages